Cài (Old Chinese: *s.r̥ˤat-s) was an ancient Chinese state established at the beginning of the Zhou dynasty, rising to prominence during the Spring and Autumn period, and destroyed early in the Warring States period.

History
Following his overthrow of the Shang king Zhou, King Wu of Zhou granted titles and territories to his younger brothers. The fifth brother, Cai Shu Du, was enfeoffed at present-day Shangcai (lit. "Upper Cai") in Henan.  During the Three Guards Rebellion, he attempted to usurp the Duke of Zhou's position as regent to the young king and his defeat meant his deposition and exile.

Du's son Ji Hu, however, proved a loyal and capable ambassador for Cheng and the Duke of Zhou, and they rewarded him with the reestablishment of his father's territory and title, which he was able to pass on to his son, Ji Huang.

As the Chinese peerage developed, Cai was initially considered a county and then elevated to a march; it was never able, however, to become a duchy or kingdom in its own right. Invasions from Chu during the Spring and Autumn period relocated Cai several times, first to Xincai (lit. "New Cai") in 531 BC and later to Xiacai (lit. "Lower Cai") at present-day Fengtai in Anhui. In 447 BC, King Hui of Chu conquered Cai completely, but allowed the marquesses to settle near Changde in Hunan and establish a rump state called Gaocai (lit. "Tall Cai"). This was destroyed 80 years later.

Legacy
With the spread of surnames to all Chinese during the Qin dynasty, many people from the former state took the surname Cai in memory of their former home.

These former subjects have undertaken two major migrations. During the Huang Chao Rebellion against the Tang in AD 875, the Cai clan moved to Guangdong and Fujian. A later migration occurred when the Ming loyalist Koxinga relocated many Cai officers to Taiwan in the 17th century.

Rulers of Cai

The rulers of Cai were all descended from the Zhou imperial Ji family and – after the first three – held the rank of hou ("Marquis").

Shu Du of Cai
Zhong Hu of Cai
Earl Huang of Cai
Marquis Gōng of Cai (蔡宮侯, Cài Gōnghóu)
Marquis Li of Cai (蔡厲侯, Cài Lìhóu)
Marquis Wu of Cai (蔡武侯, Cài Wǔhóu; 863–837 BC)
Marquis Yi of Cai (蔡夷侯, Cài Yíhóu; 837–809 BC)
Marquis Xi of Cai (蔡釐侯, Cài Xihóu;  809–761 BC)
Marquis Gòng of Cai (蔡共侯, Cài Gònghóu; 761–760 BC)
Marquis Dai of Cai (蔡戴侯, Cài Dàihóu; 759–750 BC)
Marquis Xuan of Cai (蔡宣侯, Cài Xuānhóu; 749–715 BC)
Marquis Huan of Cai (蔡桓侯, Cài Huánhóu; né 姬封人, Jī Fēngrén; 714–695 BC)
Marquis Ai of Cai (蔡哀侯, Cài Āihóu; né 姬獻舞, Jī Xiànwǔ; 694–675 BC)
Marquis Mu of Cai (蔡穆侯, Cài Mùhóu; né 姬肸, Jī Xì; 674–646 BC)
Marquis Zhuang of Cai (蔡莊侯, Cài Zhuānghóu; né 姬甲午, Jī Jiǎwǔ; 645–612 BC)
Marquis Wen of Cai (蔡文侯, Cài Wénhóu; né 姬申, Jī Shēn; 611–592 BC)
Marquis Jing of Cai (蔡景侯, Cài Jǐnghóu; né 姬固, Jī Gù; 591–543 BC)
Marquis Ling of Cai (蔡靈侯, Cài Línghóu; né 姬般, Jī Bān; 542–531 BC)
Marquis Ping of Cai (蔡平侯, Cài Pínghóu; né 姬廬, Jī Lú; 530–522 BC)
Marquis Dao of Cai (蔡悼侯, Cài Dàohóu; né 姬東國, Jī Dōngguó; 521–519 BC)
Marquis Zhao of Cai (蔡昭侯, Cài Zhāohóu; né 姬申, Jī Shēn; 518–491 BC)
Marquis Cheng of Cai (蔡成侯, Cài Chénghóu; né 姬朔, Jī Shuò; 490–472 BC)
Marquis Sheng of Cai (蔡聲侯, Cài Shēnghóu; né 姬産, Jī Chuǎn; 471–457 BC)
Marquis Yuan of Cai (蔡元侯, Cài Yuánhóu; 456–451 BC)
Marquis Qi of Cai (蔡齊侯, Cài Hóuqí; né 姬齊, Jī Qí; 450–447 BC)

Rulers family tree

See also
 Shangcai County

References
 "History of Chinese surnames: Cai" at People's Daily Online.  Accessed 10 December 2007.
 古蔡国，走过坎坷六百年 

 
States and territories established in the 11th century BC
11th-century BC establishments in China
447 BC
States and territories disestablished in the 5th century BC
5th-century BC disestablishments
1st-millennium BC disestablishments in China
Former monarchies